Inside Iraq: The Untold Stories (2004) is an Iraq War documentary film directed and written by Mike Shiley.

Cast 
 Mike Shiley

Production 
Mike Shiley wrote and directed the documentary. Sharon Okonek was the executive producer and Page Ostrow and Rick Ray were the executive producers. The music of the film was composed by Thomas Schroyer. Editing was done by Lindsey Goodwin-Grayzel, Wolfie Pfrommer, and Rick Ray.

References

External links 
 

2004 documentary films
2004 films
Documentary films about the Iraq War